The War of the Buttons or La Guerre des boutons may refer to:

 War of the Buttons (novel), 1912 novel by Louis Pergaud
 La guerre des gosses (1937 film), French film based on the novel
 War of the Buttons (1962 film), French film of the novel
 War of the Buttons (1994 film), English-language film of the novel
 War of the Buttons (2011 Christophe Barratier film), French film based on the novel
 War of the Buttons (2011 Yann Samuell film), French film based on the novel